Apollo Heights is an American shoegazing band that was formed in New York City in 2002. Consisting mainly of twin brothers Daniel and Danny Chavis, they play experimental rock music. They cite AR Kane and My Bloody Valentine as a major inspiration. Their debut album White Music For Black People was produced by Robin Guthrie of Cocteau Twins and features guest appearances from Mos Def, Lady Kier, David Sitek of TV on the Radio, Mike Ladd and Guthrie himself on guitar. The Chavis brothers were members of the alternative soul group The Veldt who released three albums on Polygram, Mammoth and Capitol Records. Although the Veldt is left out of references on the Chapel Hill music scene, they were a key band during the heyday of North Carolina music along with other bands of the time like Metal Flake Mother, Superchunk and Dillon Fence.

The Veldt recorded an EP titled Marigolds on Stardog Records in 1992 and Afrodisiac in 1994 on Polygram.

Discography

The Veldt

Marigolds (EP) (1992; Stardog)
Afrodisiac (1994; Polygram/Mercury)
Universe Boat (1996/97; Yesha)
Love At First Hate (1998; End Of The World Technologies)
The Shocking Fuzz of Your Electric Fur: The Drake equation (EP) (2016; Schoolkids Records)
Thanks to the Moth and Areanna Rose (EP) (2017; SonaBLAST! Records)
The Veldt Limited Edition RSD EP (EP) (2021, self-released)
Electric Revolution (Rhythm and Drone) (EP) (2022, Little Cloud Records)
Entropy is the Mainline to God (2022, Little Cloud Records)

Apollo Heights 2002~2009

Studio albums
White Music For Black People CD (2007; Manimal Vinyl)

EPs
Disco Lights EP digital single (2007; Manimal Vinyl)
Babytalkk EP digital single (2008; Manimal Vinyl)
Everlasting Gobbstopper EP digital single (2008; Manimal Vinyl)
Sad Cabaret Reverie EP digital single (2011; Disques Sinthomme)

Rock music groups from New York (state)
American experimental musical groups
African-American rock musical groups
American shoegaze musical groups